The Roman Catholic Diocese of Saint Paul in Alberta is a Latin Church ecclesiastical territory or diocese of the Catholic Church that includes part of the civil province of Alberta. On September 15, 2022, Gary Anthony Franken, was appointed Bishop of Saint Paul, succeeding Paul Terrio.

As of 2018, the diocese contains 20 parishes and 21 missions, 18 active diocesan priests, 6 religious priests, 8 permanent deacons, and approximately 104,000 Catholics. It also has 13 women religious. The Diocese of Saint Paul in Alberta is a suffragan diocese in the ecclesiastical province of the metropolitan Archdiocese of Edmonton.

Bishops

The following is a list of the bishops of the diocese and their terms of service:
Maurice Baudoux (1948–1952), appointed Coadjutor Archbishop of Saint-Boniface, Manitoba
 (1952–1968)
Édouard Gagnon (1969–1972)
 (1972–1997)
Thomas Collins (1997–1999); appointed Coadjutor Archbishop of Edmonton; was Apostolic Administrator here in 2001; future Cardinal
Luc-André Bouchard (2001–2012), appointed Bishop of Trois-Rivières, Québec
Paul Terrio (2012–2022)
Gary Anthony Franken (2022–present)

Coadjutor bishop
Thomas Collins (1997); future Cardinal

List of parishes 

There are 20 parishes within the diocese.

St. Paul Cathedral, St. Paul, Alberta
 Rector: Gérard Gauthier
 Associate Rector: André Semusambi
 Deacon: Greg Ouellette

St. Michael, Elk Point, Alberta
 Pastor: Gérard Gauthier
 Deacon: Mitch Goulet

St. Gabriel, Athabasca, Alberta
Pastor: Paulson Kannanaikal, cmi

St. Anne, Barrhead, Alberta
Mission of St. John the Evangelist, Swan Hills, Alberta
 Pastor: John Rohit VC, ims

St. Louis, Bonnyville, Alberta
 Pastor: Rene Realuyo

St. Alphonsus, Boyle, Alberta
Mission of Holy Rosary, Buffalo Lake Métis Settlement, Alberta
 Pastor:

St. Dominic, Cold Lake, Alberta
Mission of Our Lady of the Assumption, Cold Lake, Alberta
 Pastor: Limneo Zamora Jr. (Fr. Nong)

St. John the Baptist, Fort McMurray, Alberta
Mission of St. Gabriel, Janvier, Alberta
Mission of St. Vincent, Conklin, Alberta
 Pastor: Augustine Joseph, cmi 
 Associate Pastor: Antony Thomas, ims
 Deacon: Raymond Chan

St. Paul Church, Fort McMurray, Alberta
Mission of Nativity of Blessed Virgin Mary, Fort Chipewyan, Alberta
Mission of St. Julien, Fort MacKay, Alberta
 Pastor: Francis of Assisi Khai Phan
 Associate Pastor: Jayson Durante

St. Catherine, Lac La Biche, Alberta
Mission of Immaculate Heart of Mary, Kikino, Alberta
 Pastor: Aureus Manjares
 Deacon: Pat Murphy
 Deacon: Gordon Taylor

St. Raphael, LeGoff, Alberta
Mission of St. Marguerite d'Youville, Elizabeth Métis Settlement, Alberta
Mission of Our Lady of Good Counsel, Frog Lake Reserve, Alberta
Mission of St. Eugene, Fishing Lake, Alberta
 Pastor:  Thomas Dieu Hoang Nguyen

St. Emile, Legal, Alberta
 Pastor: Anselmo Landoy

St. Jean de Brebeuf, Mallaig, Alberta
Mission of St. Helen, St. Lina, Alberta
Mission of Our Lady of Mercy, Kehewin, Alberta
 Pastor: Raldy Jhack Diaz (Fr. Jhack)

St. Jean Baptiste, Morinville, Alberta
 Pastor: Trini C. Pinca

St. Isidore, Plamondon, Alberta
Mission of St. Theresa of the Child Jesus, Breynat, Alberta
 Pastor: Jestoni Porras
 Deacon: Jerry Metz

St. Laurent, Brosseau, Alberta
 Pastor:

St. Matthias, Goodfish Lake, Alberta
Mission of Sacred Heart, Saddle Lake, Alberta
 Pastor:

St. Anne, Thorhild, Alberta
Mission of Our Lady of the Atonement, Smoky Lake, Alberta
Mission of St. Joseph, Radway, Alberta
 Pastor: Sebastian Chittilappilly, cmi

St. Mary of Assumption, Westlock, Alberta
Mission of St. Finnan, Dapp, Alberta
Mission of St. Patrick, Clyde, Alberta
 Pastor: Ambrose Umeohanna, smmm

St. Joseph, Whitecourt, Alberta
Mission of Our Lady of Peace, Fox Creek, Alberta
 Pastor: Benjamin Belgica

References

Bibliography
Diocese of Saint Paul in Alberta page at catholichierarchy.org retrieved July 14, 2006

External links
 

Saint Paul
Religious sees in Alberta
County of St. Paul No. 19